Goli Daraq-e Olya (also Romanized as Golī Daraq-e ‘Olyā; also known as Golī Darreh-ye Bālā) is a village in Salavat Rural District, Moradlu District, Meshgin Shahr County, Ardabil Province, Iran. At the 2006 census, its population was 22, in 4 families.

References 

Towns and villages in Meshgin Shahr County